Erich Wolfgang Korngold's Piano Concerto for the Left Hand in C-sharp major, Op. 17, was written on commission from Paul Wittgenstein in 1923, and published in 1926.  It was only the second such concerto ever written, after the Concerto in E-flat by Géza Zichy, published in 1895.

Wittgenstein, who lost an arm in World War I, was to commission works from composers such as Maurice Ravel, Richard Strauss, Sergei Prokofiev and Paul Hindemith, but Korngold was one of the first composers he approached. At that time, Korngold was the most performed composer in Germany and Austria after Strauss, and, despite being only in his mid-twenties, had already written a number of operas, including his greatest triumph, Die tote Stadt.

The Concerto for the Left Hand is cast in one continuous movement, which progresses through various moods and three main sections: 
 Mässiges Zeitmass (moderate tempo)
 Heldisch (hero-like)
 Mit Feuer und Kraft (with fire and power).

It was premiered in Vienna on 22 September 1924 with Wittgenstein as soloist and the composer conducting.

In many other cases, Wittgenstein required certain revisions to the works he commissioned, but not in the Korngold case.  He was so happy with what Korngold wrote that he commissioned another work, the Suite for 2 violins, cello and piano left-hand, Op. 23.

Wittgenstein owned the exclusive performing rights to the Concerto until his death in 1961, and it gradually slipped from the repertoire.  It was revived by Gary Graffman, who gave it its United Kingdom premiere in 1985 and it has since had a number of performances.

It has been recorded by Marc-André Hamelin, Howard Shelley, and Steven de Groote. Most recently, Nicolas Stavy performs Korngold's Left Hand Concerto with the Orchestre national de Lille under the direction of Paul Polivnick.

See also
 List of works for piano left-hand and orchestra

References

Compositions by Erich Wolfgang Korngold
Korngold, Erich
1923 compositions
Compositions in C-sharp major
Concertos for piano left-hand and orchestra